Olivier Gremaud (born 8 March 1979) is a Swiss rower. He competed in the men's quadruple sculls event at the 2004 Summer Olympics.

References

1979 births
Living people
Swiss male rowers
Olympic rowers of Switzerland
Rowers at the 2004 Summer Olympics
Rowers from Zürich